The coat of arms of Podgorica is an official insignia of Podgorica, capital of Montenegro. It is a new coat of arms, adopted as a symbol of the city in 2006. It replaced the old coat of arms, which was thought outdated aesthetically. The author is Srdjan Marlović.

Description of the coat of arms
The silver shield represents water. Among all characteristics of this municipality, the most important one is its richness in water (6 rivers and Skadar Lake, the biggest lake in the Balkans).
The layers of urban heritage in this municipality (Doclea and Meteon) are presented by two blue horizontal stripes. Metaphorically, they present the foundation of the present city of Podgorica.
The universal symbol, whose creation was based on stylisation of all recognisable symbols of modern Podgorica that we know today: Nemanja's town, the clock tower, Gorica monument, gates, bridges, etc. are all combined into one symbol, a broken line positioned above the 2 horizontal stripes.
The crown represents the town's status as Montenegro's capital city.
Two silver lions act as supporters and are inspired by the oldest known coat of arms on Podgorica municipality, the arms of Božidar Vuković-Podgoričanin.
The golden wine leaves represent the vineyards that Podgorica is known for.

Historical coats of arms

See also
Armorial of Montenegro
Flag of Podgorica

References

Year of establishment missing
Culture in Podgorica
Podgorica
Podgorica